Bimal Mulubha Jadeja (born 22 August 1964) is an Indian former first-class cricketer and Former Captain of Saurashtra cricket team. He became a cricket coach after his playing career.

Career
A left-handed batsman and occasional leg break bowler, Jadeja played first-class cricket for Saurashtra and West Zone. He appeared in a total of 81 first-class and 18 List A matches in his career that lasted between 1980/81 and 1999/00 seasons. He made more than 4800 runs at an average of over 41, along with 14 centuries, in first-class cricket. He also captained the Saurashtra team during his career.

Jadeja worked as a cricket coach after retirement. After having coached the Gujarat team in Ranji Trophy, he was appointed as the coach of the Central Board of Cricket Ahmedabad in 2014.

Personal life
Jadeja's father Mulubha Jadeja had played first-class cricket for Saurashtra and Railways as a right-handed batsman between 1945/46 and 1964/65.He has one son named Bimal Jadeja who is former Ranji player and Coach. Jadeja is also a distant relative of Ranjitsinhji (Jamranjitsinhji) who played Test cricket for England.

References

External links 
 
 

1964 births
Living people
Indian cricketers
Saurashtra cricketers
West Zone cricketers
Indian cricket coaches
cotegory: Highest Ranjitropy matches played by a player for saurashtra before 2003